Bruns Avenue is a streetcar station in Charlotte, North Carolina. The at-grade island platform on West Trade Street is a stop along the CityLynx Gold Line, serving the Seversville and Western Heights neighborhoods.

Location 
Bruns Avenue station is located on West Trade Street, between South Bruns Avenue and North Bruns Avenue, and is flanked by the Mosaic Village and Jerusalem House of God. The Seversville and Western Heights neighborhoods, part of West End, were established in the late 1800s; with Seversville developing as a ring village that was economically focused with nearby Savona Mill, and Western Heights developed by W. L. Alexander as a purpose built residential suburb. Off West Trade Street, the area is a mix of single-family homes and multifamily residential buildings.

History 
Bruns Avenue station was approved as a Gold Line Phase 2 stop in 2013, with construction beginning in Fall 2016. Though it was slated to open in early-2020, various delays pushed out the opening till mid-2021. The station opened to the public on August 30, 2021.

Station layout 
The station consists of an island platform with two passenger shelters; a crosswalk and ramp provide platform access from West Trade Street. The station's passenger shelters house two art installations by George Bates. The windscreens are titled: The Worth of That, is That Which It Contains and That is This, and This With Thee Remains. The title comes from a 1954 JCSU yearbook excerpt referencing Shakespeare's sonnet 74. The micro and macro figures and images share the specific and general history of the area.

References

External links
 
 Historic West End

Lynx Gold Line stations
Railway stations in the United States opened in 2021
2021 establishments in North Carolina